Mario Toso S.D.B. (born 2 July 1950) has been the Bishop of the Diocese of Faenza-Modigliana since his appointment by Pope Francis on 19 January 2015.

Toso was born in Mogliano Veneto (Province of Treviso). He was professed a member of the Salesians of Don Bosco on 16 August 1967. He studied philosophy and theology at the Faculty of Theology in Turin. He obtained a baccalaureate in theology. He was ordained a priest on 22 July 1978.

He holds a doctorate in philosophy at the Catholic University of Sacro Cuore in Milan in 1978. He earned a licentiate in philosophy from the Pontifical Salesian University in 1981 and a licentiate in theology at the Pontifical Lateran University in 1982. Since 1980 he has served as Professor of Philosophy at the Pontifical Salesian University from 1991 and is Professor of Theoretical Philosophy, from 1994 to 2000. He was Dean of the Faculty of Philosophy at the same University and from 2003 to 2009, he was Rector. He served as a consultor of the Pontifical Council for Justice and Peace. Toso was one of the collaborators consulted by Pope Benedict XVI's encyclical Caritas in veritate.

On 22 October 2009 he was appointed secretary of the Pontifical Council for Justice and Peace and Titular Bishop of Bisarcio, the titular see held by Bishop Crepaldi before his transfer to Trieste, and was consecrated on 12 December 2009 by Cardinal Secretary of State Tarcisio Bertone.

On 19 January 2015 he was appointed bishop of the Roman Catholic Diocese of Faenza-Modigliana.

References

1950 births
Living people
People from Mogliano Veneto
Università Cattolica del Sacro Cuore alumni
Pontifical Lateran University alumni
Pontifical Council for Justice and Peace
21st-century Italian titular bishops
Salesian Pontifical University alumni
Salesians of Don Bosco
21st-century Italian Roman Catholic bishops